Claire Merritt Hodgson Ruth, born Clara Mae Merritt (September 11, 1900 – October 25, 1976), was a native of Athens, Georgia, United States, who is most famous for having been the second wife of Babe Ruth.

Biography
Claire's first husband, Frank Hodgson, died February 16, 1921, leaving her with a daughter, Julia. She met Ruth in 1923. Ruth was still married to Helen Woodford, his first wife, at this time. Woodford died in a house fire in January 1929, and Ruth and Hodgson married that April 17, staying together until Ruth's death in 1948. 

In later years, she indicated her responsibility, in part, for the poor relationship between her husband and teammate Lou Gehrig. According to Claire, Gehrig's mother indicated that the Ruths' adopted daughter, Dorothy, was not as well dressed as Claire's biological daughter, Julia; when Ruth was informed of this, he angrily demanded that Gehrig never speak to him off the ballfield again. Ruth and Gehrig did not make up until the day of Gehrig's famous "I'm the luckiest man on the face of this earth" speech in 1939. Later, Claire admitted that she had overreacted, apologetically accepting full responsibility for the rift between the two players—which, however, had numerous other causes besides the one indicated by Claire.

Claire lived to see two of Ruth's most famous records broken: his single season record of 60 home runs, superseded by Roger Maris in 1961; and his career record of 714 home runs, which was broken by Hank Aaron in 1974. In her twilight years, she sometimes attended games that Aaron was playing, and was supportive of Aaron's effort. Ruth was quoted as saying: "The Babe loved baseball so very much; I know he was pulling for Hank Aaron to break his record."

Mrs. Ruth was portrayed by Claire Trevor in the 1948 film The Babe Ruth Story, by Lisa Zane in the 1991 TV-movie Babe Ruth, by Kelly McGillis in the 1992 film The Babe, and by Renee Taylor in 61*.

Claire Ruth is buried next to her husband at Gate of Heaven Cemetery in Hawthorne, New York. The inscription on the headstone lists her birth year as 1900, instead of 1897.

References

1900 births
1976 deaths
Babe Ruth
Burials at Gate of Heaven Cemetery (Hawthorne, New York)
People from Athens, Georgia